Landrum Rymer Bolling (November 13, 1913 – January 17, 2018) was an American journalist and diplomat and a noted pacifist who was a leading expert and activist for peaceful resolution of the Israel-Palestine conflict. He first worked as a war correspondent during and after World War II. He taught at Beloit College and Brown University before serving as president of Earlham College from 1958 to 1973. He was actively involved in the foreign policies of several presidential administrations, serving as an unofficial communication channel between the U.S. and the Palestinian Liberation Organization in Jimmy Carter's administration. He was honored with many awards for his work to promote peace, and in the fall of 2002, Earlham College named its new social sciences building after him.

Early life and education
Bolling was born in Parksville, Tennessee, the son of Baptist parents Landrum Austin Bolling and Carrie Mae Bolling (née Rymer). He earned his bachelor's degree at the University of Tennessee at Knoxville in 1933 and went to work for the Tennessee Valley Authority  under Arthur Ernest Morgan, former president of Antioch College and a convert to Quakerism. Bolling married Morgan's daughter Frances (1914-2008) on July 6, 1936, and they had six children. Bolling obtained his master's degree in Political Science at the University of Chicago in 1938. He became a Quaker, and this religion informed his pacifism and belief in the importance of understanding the other side's point of view.

Military career and journalism

Bolling began work as a journalist. During World War II, while teaching at Beloit College in Wisconsin, he relinquished his status as a conscientious objector to serve as a war correspondent for a collection of Wisconsin newspapers. He reported from the European theater, successively from Rome, Vienna, and Berlin. He later became one of few international correspondents to gain entry to Yugoslavia and reported from Sarajevo during its liberation from Nazi occupation. After the end of the war, he remained in Berlin to work as an editor for the Overseas News Agency, based in New York.

Academic career

Bolling was an instructor of political science at Brown University from 1938 to 1940. He then became an associate professor at Beloit College, and in 1948 he became a professor of political science at Earlham College. He was promoted to the position of General Secretary of Earlham in 1955, and in 1958 he became president of the college, a position he held for fifteen years. After his term ended in 1973, Bolling became the president of the Lilly Endowment, a large grant making foundation; he stayed in this position until 1978, when he became chief executive officer of the Council on Foundations. In these positions Bolling helped to fund research at colleges and universities across the country. In 1982 he served as research professor of the Institute for the Study of Diplomacy at the Georgetown University School of Foreign Service for one year. He was also chairman or board member of the Associated Colleges of Indiana, the Indiana Conference on Higher Education, the National Association of Protestant Colleges and Universities, and the Association of American Colleges.

Earlham College presidency

Bolling was president of Earlham College from 1958 to 1973, during which time the college began to become nationally known. Under his leadership, the college gained a Phi Beta Kappa chapter and hired its first African American faculty member, William Cousins. Bolling greatly expanded off-campus and international programs and supported building initiatives, adding the Lilly Library, Hoerner Residence Hall, the Runyan Center, and Noyes and Stanley Halls to the facilities the school offered. After his resignation, Bolling was named an honorary trustee of Earlham College. In 2002, the college named its new social sciences building, the Landrum Bolling Center for Interdisciplinary Studies and Social Sciences, after him, as a tribute to his work to promote peaceful, socially just cooperation between different groups of people.

Governmental work and activism

Bolling was an activist for peace and social justice throughout his life, both in the United States and abroad. After working as a journalist, he worked in the government to help improve communications between the U.S. and Palestine for many years, under several presidents. Most notably, during Jimmy Carter's administration, he was a highly trusted unofficial backchannel from the White House to the Palestine Liberation Organization and its leader, Yaser Arafat. He maintained his connections to leaders on all sides of the conflicts in the Middle East throughout his career. Later, he worked with non-governmental organizations, government officials, and religious leaders in Bosnia to promote cooperation between ethnic and religious groups. He also worked extensively with Mercy Corps, an international humanitarian agency, serving first as Director-at-Large and subsequently as a senior advisor, and was president of Pax World Service, a non-profit group affiliated with Mercy Corps. From 1983 to 1988, he was president and rector at the Tantur Ecumenical Institute in Jerusalem. He was also a senior advisor and board member of the Conflict Management Group in Cambridge, Massachusetts, and a senior fellow at the Center for International Policy in Washington, D.C.

On the eve of Bolling's centennial birthday, former president Jimmy Carter emailed a tribute to the daily newspaper in the city where Earlham College is located:

A longtime friend and colleague, Landrum Bolling is renowned for his many achievements as an educator and journalist, leader in philanthropic, humanitarian, and interfaith efforts, and as a citizen peacemaker. Knowing of his personal acquaintance with Israeli and Arab leaders and his experience in the region, I turned to him for advice and assistance while negotiating the Camp David Accords while I was president. Throughout the years, he has remained a trusted and valued adviser in our work at The Carter Center.

Publications

Bolling wrote or co-wrote several books. His first book, Search for Peace in the Middle East (American Friends Service Committee 1970), is an analysis of the conflict in the Middle East that helped to inspire today's two-state solution. His other books include This is Germany, Private Foreign Aid: U.S. philanthropy for relief and development (Westview Press 1982), Reporters Under Fire: U.S. Media Coverage of Conflicts in Lebanon and Central America (Westview Press 1984), and Conflict Resolution: Track Two Diplomacy. Bolling also wrote the documentary Searching for Peace in the Middle East.

Honors and awards

Bolling received honorary doctorates from over thirty foreign and American colleges and universities, including the University of Tennessee at Knoxville, the University of Notre Dame, Oberlin College, Haverford College, Indiana University, and Waseda University. In 1998, the University of Tennessee at Knoxville awarded him its prestigious Founders Medal. In 2000, the National Peace Foundation honored him with the Peacemaker/Peacebuilder award. In 2005, he received the James L. Fisher Award for Distinguished Service to Education by the Council for Advancement and Support of Education, and in 2010 he received the lifetime achievement award from the National Council on U.S.-Arab Relations.

References

1913 births
2018 deaths
People from Polk County, Tennessee
University of Tennessee alumni
Beloit College faculty
Brown University faculty
Earlham College faculty
Heads of universities and colleges in the United States
Educators from Tennessee
Journalists from Tennessee
20th-century Quakers
21st-century Quakers
American pacifists
American centenarians
American diplomats
Men centenarians